Haemolymph: Invisible Blood is an Indian 2022 Hindi language Crime drama film written and directed by Sudarshan Gamare. The story is based on 'Wahid din Mohammed shaikh', who is one of the accused of the 7/11 serial bomb blast on the Mumbai local train. 
The film stars Riyaz Anwar, Ruchira Jadhav, Rohit Kokate, Neelam Kulkarni, Datta Jadhav and Sayli Bandkar. It was theatrically released in India on 27 May 2022.

Cast 
 Riyaz Anwar as Wahid Shaikh
 Ruchira Jadhav as Sajida Shaikh
 Rohit Kokate as Javed Shaikh
 Neelam Kulkarni as Wahids Mother
 Datta Jadhav as Wahids father
 Sayli Bandkar as Javeds wife
 Ankit Mhatre
 Sunil Tambe
 Vijaya Mahajan  
 Sagar Pable

Release 
Haemolymph: Invisible Blood will be released theatrically on 27 May 2022.

References

External links
 
 

2020s Hindi-language films